WICL (95.9 FM) is a Country formatted broadcast radio station licensed to Williamsport, Maryland, serving the Hagerstown/Martinsburg area. WICL is owned and operated by John and David Raese, through licensee West Virginia Radio Corporation of the Alleghenies.

History

The station was started as WYII, a Country station, by Ken Smith in 1972.  It operated this way until 2000, when it was bought by Prettyman Broadcasting Company.  Also in 2000, it became Adult Contemporary formatted WLTF (which is now on 97.5).

In 2001, WLTF moved to 97.5 and then classic rocker WKMZ moved to 95.9.  In 2005, WKMZ dropped its classic rock format for Oldies and picked up the WICL calls.  WICL dropped all on-air talent in 2008, airing programming directly from the True Oldies Channel network from ABC Radio.  On July 4, 2012, WICL switched formats from Oldies to Classic Hits under the branding "95.9 The Greatest Hits Of All Time".

On September 24, 2012, WICL switched from Classic Hits to Classic Country, a format previously abandoned by WNUZ (then WPPT) earlier in 2012, changing their branding to simply "95-9".  On September 28, 2012, the station rebranded as "95-9 The Big Dawg" and morphed into a country music format playing both classic and new country music.

Location
While the station is licensed to Williamsport, Maryland, the studios for WICL are located in Martinsburg, West Virginia and the tower is located just south of Hagerstown, Maryland.

Sale
On October 31, 2014, Prettyman Broadcasting announced the sale of WICL to West Virginia Radio Corporation (WVRC) for an unknown sum. Included in the same are sister stations WEPM and WLTF. WVRC assumed control of the stations, through a Local marketing agreement, on November 1. The purchase was consummated on February 13, 2015, at a price of $3 million.

References

External links
95-9 The Big Dawg Online
95-9 The Big Dawg on Facebook

ICL